is a train station in the city of Matsumoto, Nagano Prefecture, Japan, operated by East Japan Railway Company (JR East).

Lines
Shimatakamatsu Station is served by the Ōito Line and is 3.8 kilometers from the terminus of the line at Matsumoto Station.

Station layout
The station consists of one ground-level side platform, serving a single bi-directional track. There is no station building, but only a shelter on the platform. The station is unattended.

History
Shimatakamatsu Station opened on 14 April 1926. With the privatization of Japanese National Railways (JNR) on 1 April 1987, the station came under the control of JR East. A new elevated station building was completed in April 2000.

Surrounding area

See also
 List of railway stations in Japan

References

External links

 JR East station information 

Railway stations in Matsumoto City
Ōito Line
Railway stations in Japan opened in 1926
Stations of East Japan Railway Company